Athens City Schools is the public school district of Athens, Alabama, USA.  As of 2016 it has some 3,904 students and 230 full-time teachers.  The district includes one high school http://www.acs-k12.org/ahs, one middle school (6-8) Athens Middle School, one intermediate school (4-5) Athens Intermediate School, and four elementary academies (K-3) i Academy at Athens Elementary, FAME Academy at Brookhill, SPARK Academy at Cowart, and HEART Academy at Julian Newman. Athens City Schools has one non-traditional blended learning school (K-12) Athens Renaissaince School. As of July 2020, the acting superintendent is Beth Patton.

External links 
 Athens City Schools

School districts in Alabama
Education in Limestone County, Alabama